Adnan Rasool (born 1 May 1981) is a Pakistani Domestic cricketer. He played domestic cricket for various teams including Lahore Lions, Faisalabad, NBP, SNGPL and Lahore Eagles.

References

External links
 

1981 births
Living people
Cricketers from Faisalabad
Lahore Qalandars cricketers
Lahore Lions cricketers
Lahore Eagles cricketers
Sui Northern Gas Pipelines Limited cricketers
National Bank of Pakistan cricketers